Joseph G. Giambra (October 31, 1933 – May 14, 2020) was an American jazz musician, actor, and businessman.

Early life
Giambra was born in Buffalo, New York, in 1933. His elementary school teacher, Anne Rodenhoffer, sparked his interest in music and drama. While attending Hutchinson Central Technical High School, he formed a band.

Career
Giambra was a trumpeter, composer, bandleader, and actor in New York. He joined the Buffalo Police Department in 1963 and earned a degree in criminology from SUNY Buffalo State at the age of 44. He also owned two restaurants, the Hard Times Cafe, which started in Allentown and moved to Hertel Avenue, and the Rib Crib, on East Chippewa Street.

He appeared in the films Hide in Plain Sight, Buffalo '66, Prizzi's Honor, Nighthawks and Marshall.

Personal life
Giambra and his wife, Shirley, had two children. Giambra died from COVID-19 in Buffalo, New York, during the COVID-19 pandemic in New York.

Filmography

Film

References

External links
 https://www.imdb.com/name/nm3681152

1933 births
2020 deaths
Musicians from Buffalo, New York
Place of death missing
Jazz musicians
Deaths from the COVID-19 pandemic in New York (state)
Buffalo State College alumni
Jazz musicians from New York (state)
American people of Italian descent
American jazz trumpeters